André Pieyre de Mandiargues (14 March 1909 – 13 December 1991) was a French writer born in Paris. He became an associate of the Surrealists and married the Italian painter Bona Tibertelli de Pisis (a niece of the Italian metaphysical painter Count Filippo Tibertelli de Pisis).  He was a particularly close friend of the painter Leonor Fini.

His novel La Marge (1967; Eng: The Margin) won the Prix Goncourt and was made into a film of the same name by Walerian Borowczyk in 1976. It is his collection of pornographic items that is featured in Borowczyk's Une collection particulière. Borowczyk also used Mandiargues' work for the first story included in his anthology film Immoral Tales. 

He also wrote an introduction to Anne Desclos's Story of O and was a signatory to the Manifesto of the 121.

His book Feu de braise (1959) was published in 1971 in an English translation by April FitzLyon called Blaze of Embers (Calder and Boyars, 1971).

His most popular book was The Motorcycle (1963), which was adapted for the 1968 film The Girl on a Motorcycle, starring a young Marianne Faithfull. Mandiargues was friends with motorcycle journalist Anke-Eve Goldmann, who was likely the inspiration for the main character 'Rebecca', as Goldmann was the first woman to ride a motorcycle with a one-piece leather racing suit, which she designed with German manufacturer Harro.

Works 
 Le Musée noir (1946)
 L'Anglais décrit dans le château fermé (1953)
 Le Lis de mer (1956)
 Le Belvédère (1958)
 Feu de braise (1959)
 La motocyclette (1963)
 La Marge (1967)
 Isabella Morra (1974)
 Tout disparaîtra (1987)

Further reading
 Jean-Louis de Rambures, "Comment travaillent les écrivains", Paris 1978 (interview with de Mandiargues, in French)
 Denise Bourdet, André Pieyre de Mandiargues, dans: Visages d'aujourd'hui, Paris, Plon, 1960.
Bond David J., The Fiction of André Pieyre de Mandiargues, Syracuse, N.Y., Syracuse University Press, 1982
 Cadorel Raymond, Résurgences mexicaines dans l'œuvre de Mandiargues, Recifs, Sorbonne nouvelle, Paris III 
 Castant Alexandre, Esthétique de l'image, fictions d'André Pieyre de Mandiargues. Publications de la Sorbonne, Paris, 2001.
Demornex Jacqueline, Le Pire, c'est la neige, Paris, Sabine Wespiesser éditeur, 2009.
Gras-Durosini Dominique, Mandiargues et ses récits : L'écriture en jeu . Paris, L'Harmattan, 2006.
Grossman Simone, L'œil du poète. Pieyre de Mandiargues et la peinture, Paris-Caen, Lettres modernes-Minard, "Archives des lettres modernes" No. 273, 1999.
Laroque-Texier Sophie, Lecture de Mandiargues, Paris, L'Harmattan, 2005.
Leroy Claude, Le mythe de la passante de Baudelaire à Mandiargues. Paris, P.U.F., 1999.
 Martellucci Filippo, L'occhio libro. Studio sul linguaggio dell'immagine nella poesia di Pieyre de Mandiargues, Roma, Bulzoni, 1995.
Mallard Alain-Paul et Pieyre de Mandiargues Sibylle (dir.), André Pieyre de Mandiargues / Pages mexicaines", Gallimard / Maison de l'Amérique latine, 2009.
Patriarca Francesco et Pieyre de Mandiargues Sibylle, L'appartement. Filigranes Éditions, 2004.
Pierre José, Le Belvédère Mandiargues. Paris, Biro/ArtCurial, 1990.
Rambures, Jean-Louis de (entretien avec), Comment travaillent les écrivains, Paris, Flammarion, 1978.
Stétié Salah, Mandiargues. Paris, Seghers, 1978.
Stétié Salah, « Pieyre de Mandiargues André », Dictionnaire de poésie de Baudelaire à nos jours (dir. Michel Jarrety), Paris, PUF, 2001.
Ternisien Caecilia, Mandiargues. L'Entrelacs du corps et du romanesque, coll. "Savoir Lettres", éd. Hermann, 2016.

 Ouvrages collectifs, revues, cataloguesLivres de France, No. 9, November 1966.Cahiers Renaud-Barrault, No. 86, 1974 (sur Isabella Morra).Cahiers du 20e siècle, Paris, Klincksieck, nº 6, 1976.Revue des Sciences Humaines, No. 193, 1984-1.Lendemains, nº 91/92, Tübingen, Stauffenburg Verlag, 1998.De la bibliothèque de Bona et André Pieyre de Mandiargues, Paris, catalogue de la Librairie galerie Emmanuel Hutin, 2005.
 André Pieyre de Mandiargues. De La Motocyclette à Monsieur Mouton, sous la direction d'Yves Baudelle et de Caecilia Ternisien, Roman 20-50, No. 5, April 2009.André Pieyre de Mandiargues, Europe, No. 981-982, January–February 2011.Plaisir à Mandiargues, sous la direction de Marie-Paule Berranger et de Claude Leroy, Paris, Hermann, 2011.L'Œil d'un poète'', collection André et Bona Pieyre de Mandiargues, catalogue de la vente chez Christie's, Paris, 24 October 2011.

References

External links
 
 

1909 births
1991 deaths
Writers from Paris
Prix Goncourt winners
Burials at Père Lachaise Cemetery
20th-century French novelists
French male novelists
20th-century French male writers